After each season, the WNBL recognises the league leaders of each statistical category.

Statistical leaders

Points

Rebounds

Assists

Steals

Blocks

References 

Statistical Leaders
Basketball statistics